Peter Gary Menzies Jr.,  is an Australian cinematographer best known for his work on blockbuster action films such as Die Hard with a Vengeance, Lara Croft: Tomb Raider, The Incredible Hulk, and Clash of the Titans.

Life and career 
Menzies was born in Sydney, Australia. He was introduced to the film industry by his father, director and cinematographer Peter Menzies Sr. He started as a camera loader and worked his way through the ranks in commercials and features as a camera assistant and later as an operator, working regularly under DPs David Gribble and Russell Boyd. He made his debut as cinematographer on White Sands, a crime film directed by Roger Donaldson and starring Willem Dafoe.

Since then, Menzies has worked mostly on action films like Die Hard with a Vengeance, Hard Rain and Shooter. He has collaborated with directors like John Singleton, Bruce Beresford, David Nutter, Simon West, John McTiernan, and Joel Schumacher. 

Menzies is a member of the Academy of Motion Picture Arts and Sciences, and is the Chairman of the Board for the Grand Jury of the Cordillera International Film Festival in Reno/Tahoe Nevada.

Filmography

Film

Additional photography credits

Television 

Refs:

References

External links 

cinematographers.nl profile
Peter Menzies Jr. Biography - film reference

Year of birth missing (living people)
Living people
Australian cinematographers
People from Sydney